Bedazzled is a 2000 fantasy romantic comedy film directed by Harold Ramis and starring Brendan Fraser and Elizabeth Hurley. It is a remake of the 1967 British film of the same name, written by Peter Cook and Dudley Moore, which was itself a comic retelling of the Faust legend.

Plot
The Devil runs a computer simulation to analyze souls to determine individual weaknesses to exploit. The program settles on Elliot Richards, a geeky, over-zealous man working a dead-end job in a San Francisco computer company. He has no friends and his co-workers avoid him. He has a crush on colleague Alison Gardner, but lacks the courage to ask her out. After Elliot is ditched by his co-workers at a bar while trying to talk to Alison, he says he would give anything for Alison to be with him. The Devil, in the form of a beautiful woman, overhears him and offers to give Elliot seven wishes in exchange for his soul.

As a test, Elliot wishes for a Big Mac and a large Coke. The Devil takes him to McDonald's and places the order. Elliot has to pay for it, because, "There's no such thing as a free lunch." After taking Elliot to her office, based at a nightclub in Oakland, the Devil convinces Elliot to sign her  contract, and delivers further wishes. Each wish has Elliot living them out with Alison and his co-workers in surrogate roles. However, the Devil always spoils his wishes by adding something he does not expect or want.

After going through five wishes, Elliot is arrested after confessing his story to a priest who believed he was drunk. The Devil, dressed as a police officer, throws him in a cell, telling him that she likes him, and it would not hurt to have her as a friend. Elliot's friendly cellmate tells him that he cannot sell his soul as it belongs to God, and although the Devil may try to confuse him, in the end he will realize who he truly is, and what his purpose is. Elliot questions the man as to his identity, but the response is simply "a really good friend".

Elliot asks the Devil to cancel their contract. When the Devil refuses, Elliot states he will not use his final wish. The Devil teleports them to Hell. When the Devil pushes him to make a final wish, Elliot wishes that Alison could have a happy life – with or without him. The Devil sighs and Elliot falls into the depths of Hell. He wakes up on a marble staircase, wondering if it is Heaven. The Devil tells him that a provision in the contract's fine print states that a selfless wish voids the contract. Elliot admits that despite her manipulation of him he has come to like the Devil and regards her as a friend. She advises that Heaven and Hell can be found on Earth; it is up to humans to choose. Elliot asks Alison out, but discovers she is already dating another man. He continues with his life, with a better understanding of who he is.

Elliot is confronted by Bob, one of his co-workers, who ridicules Elliot at the encouragement of his co-workers. Elliot grabs a terrified Bob by the shirt, but lets go, simply saying, "Nice talking to you." At home, he meets a new neighbor, Nicole Delarusso, whose looks resemble Alison's but whose personality, interests and fashion sense are much closer to his. He offers to help her unpack and they begin a relationship. While the two walk along a boulevard, the Devil and Elliot's cellmate, both dressed in white, are playing chess. The Devil's computer program lists Nicole and Elliot's foibles, which they tolerate.

Cast
 Brendan Fraser as Elliot Richards / Jefe / "Mary" / Abraham Lincoln
 Elizabeth Hurley as The Devil 
 Frances O'Connor as Alison Gardner / Nicole Delarusso
 Orlando Jones as Daniel / Dan / Danny / Esteban / Beach Jock / Lamar Garrett / Dr. Ngegitigegitibaba
 Paul Adelstein as Bob Bob / Roberto / Beach Jock
 Toby Huss as Jerry / Alejandro / Beach Jock / Jerry Turner / Lance
 Miriam Shor as Carol / Penthouse Hostess
 Gabriel Casseus as Elliot's Cellmate
 Brian Doyle-Murray as Priest
 Jeff Doucette as Desk Sergeant
 Aaron Lustig as Synedyne supervisor
 Rudolf Martin as Raoul
 Julian Firth as John Wilkes Booth

Release

Home media
Bedazzled was released on DVD and VHS on March 13, 2001.

Reception

Box office
The film did reasonably well at the box office. It topped British box office sales when it debuted in the UK during the weekend of 10 November 2000, and finished at #2 on its American opening weekend behind the surprise smash hit Meet the Parents.

Critical response
The film received mixed reviews from critics. Hurley's performance was praised, but her attendance of its premiere was met with backlash from the Screen Actors Guild because it occurred during a strike it was holding. On Rotten Tomatoes the film has an approval rating of 50% based on 115 reviews, with an average of 5.5/10. The site's general consensus states: "Though it has its funny moments, this remake is essentially a one joke movie with too many flat plots, and not a patch on the superior original." On Metacritic the film has a score of 49 out of 100 based on reviews from 34 critics, indicating "mixed or average reviews".

Michael Wilmington of the Chicago Tribune wrote, disappointedly, that "'Bedazzled' recycled is not the finest hour for Fraser or Hurley—though Fraser, Elliot Richards in this movie, comes closer. It isn't Ramis' finest hour either—though he's one American moviemaker who excels at concept comedies, as he's proved in Groundhog Day and Dave and the best parts of the crude and lewd Caddyshack. Bedazzled, one of the best comic premises ever, should have been duck soup to him." Wilmington's rival, the Chicago Sun-Times Roger Ebert, commented that "the new movie has been directed by Harold Ramis from a screenplay that uses the 1967 film more as inspiration than source. It is lacking in wickedness. It doesn't smack its lips when it's naughty. When its hero sells his soul to the devil, what results isn't diabolical effrontery, but a series of contract negotiations and consumer complaints. This is twice in two weeks (after the Winona Ryder exorcism movie Lost Souls) that Satan loses on points." The Los Angeles Times Kenneth Turan stated that "as written by Larry Gelbart, director Harold Ramis and Peter Tolan, this 'Bedazzled,' though amusing from moment to moment, is erratic, unfocused and uncertain where it's going. And whenever it gets too insecure about itself, the film falls back, in classic the-devil-made-me-do-it Hollywood fashion, on explosions, gunfights, helicopter stunts, car crashes and computer-generated effects. What should be a drawing-room comedy ends with moments best left to Gone in 60 Seconds."

References

External links 

 
 
 
 
 
 
 

2000 films
2000 fantasy films
2000 romantic comedy films
2000s English-language films
2000s fantasy comedy films
2000s romantic fantasy films
20th Century Fox films
American fantasy comedy films
American remakes of British films
American romantic comedy films
American romantic fantasy films
The Devil in film
Fictional depictions of Abraham Lincoln in film
Films about reincarnation
Films about wish fulfillment
Films directed by Harold Ramis
Films produced by Harold Ramis
Films scored by David Newman
Films with screenplays by Harold Ramis
Films with screenplays by Larry Gelbart
Films with screenplays by Peter Tolan
German fantasy comedy films
English-language German films
German romantic comedy films
German romantic fantasy films
Regency Enterprises films
Works based on the Faust legend
2000s American films
2000s German films